It was a Dacian fortified town.

References

Dacian fortresses in Dâmbovița County
Historic monuments in Dâmbovița County
History of Muntenia